Phyllonorycter hissarella is a moth of the family Gracillariidae. It is known from Tajikistan.

The larvae feed on Cotoneaster hissarica. They probably mine the leaves of their host plant.

References

hissarella
Moths of Asia
Moths described in 1993